Kingston Township is one of twelve townships in Caldwell County, Missouri, and is part of the Kansas City metropolitan area with the USA.  As of the 2000 census, its population was 543.

Geography
It contains two cemeteries: Brown and Dustin.

The streams of Goose Creek, Jim Creek, Log Creek, Long Creek, Mill Creek and Tub Creek run through this township.

References

External links
 US-Counties.com
 City-Data.com

Townships in Caldwell County, Missouri
Townships in Missouri